Maulévrier-Sainte-Gertrude is a commune in the Seine-Maritime department in the Normandy region in northern France.

Geography

Heraldry

Population

Places of interest
 The church of St. Gertrude, dating from the sixteenth century.
 The church of St.Léonard, dating from the eleventh century.
 The thirteenth century donjon.
 Traces of another feudal castle.

See also
Communes of the Seine-Maritime department

References

External links

 Official website of Maulévrier-Sainte-Gertrude 

Communes of Seine-Maritime